Oberea bicoloricornis is a species of flat-faced longhorn beetle in the tribe Saperdini in the genus Oberea, discovered by Pic in 1915.

References

B
Beetles described in 1915